Bobovište is a village in Serbia, in the municipality of Aleksinac in Nisava district.  According to the census of 2002, there were 1,074 people (according to the census of 1991, there were 1,226 inhabitants).

Demographics
Bobovište lhas 888 adult inhabitants. Their average age is 44.9 years (43.6 for men and 46.2 for women).  The village has 390 households, with the average number of occupants per household is 2.75. The village is largely populated by Serbs (according to the census of 2002). The last four censuses have witnessed a decrease in population.

Populated places in Nišava District